The Edmonton Rush are a lacrosse team based in Edmonton playing in the National Lacrosse League (NLL). The 2010 season will be the 5th in franchise history.

Regular season

Conference standings

Game log
Reference:

Playoffs

Game log
Reference:

Transactions

New players
 Matt Disher - signed as free agent
 Derek Malawsky - acquired in trade
 Brodie Merrill - Portland dispersal draft
 Justin Norbraten - acquired in trade
 Mark Scherman - acquired in trade
 Scott Stewart - acquired in trade
 Ryan Ward - acquired in trade

Players not returning
 Ryan Benesch - traded
 Dave Cutten - traded
 Scott Self - traded
 Dan Teat - traded
 Spencer Martin - released

Trades

*Later traded back to the Edmonton Rush

Entry draft
The 2009 NLL Entry Draft took place on September 9, 2009. The Rush selected the following players:

 Denotes player who never played in the NLL regular season or playoffs

Roster

See also
2010 NLL season

References

Edmonton